Latvia participated in the Eurovision Song Contest 2021 with the song "The Moon Is Rising" written by Samanta Tīna, Aminata Savadogo and Oskars Uhaņs. The song was performed by Samanta Tīna, who was internally selected by Latvian broadcaster Latvijas Televīzija (LTV) to represent that nation at the 2021 contest in Rotterdam, Netherlands. Songwriter Aminata Savadogo represented Latvia in the Eurovision Song Contest 2015 with the song "Love Injected" where she placed sixth in the grand final of the competition. Samanta Tīna was announced as the Latvian representative on 2 April 2020 after she was due to compete in the 2020 contest with "Still Breathing" before the 2020 event's cancellation. Her song, "The Moon Is Rising", was presented to the public on 12 March 2021 during the final episode of the special documentary series .

Latvia was drawn to compete in the second semi-final of the Eurovision Song Contest which took place on 20 May 2021. Performing during the show in position 15, "The Moon Is Rising" was not announced among the top 10 entries of the second semi-final and therefore did not qualify to compete in the final. It was later revealed that Latvia placed seventeenth (last) out of the 17 participating countries in the semi-final with 14 points.

Background 

Prior to the 2021 contest, Latvia had participated in the Eurovision Song Contest twenty times since its first entry in 2000. Between 2009 and 2014, the nation had failed to qualify to the final for six consecutive years before managing to qualify to the final in 2015 and 2016. Latvia had failed to qualify to the final for three consecutive years since 2017 including with their 2019 entry "That Night" performed by Carousel.

The Latvian national broadcaster,  (LTV), broadcasts the event within Latvia and organises the selection process for the nation's entry. LTV confirmed their intentions to participate at the 2021 Eurovision Song Contest on 16 May 2020. Latvia has selected their entries for the Eurovision Song Contest through a national final. Since their debut in 2000 until 2012, LTV had organised the selection show . After failing to produce successful entries those two years, LTV developed and had organised the Supernova national final since 2015. The broadcaster internally selected both the artist and song for the 2021 contest, marking the first time that an internal selection was held for a Latvian Eurovision entry.

Before Eurovision

Internal selection 

The Latvian entry for the Eurovision Song Contest 2021 was selected internally. On 16 May 2020, LTV confirmed during their pre-show discussion of the replacement show Eurovision: Europe Shine a Light that Samanta Tīna would remain as Latvia's representative for the Eurovision Song Contest 2021. To create her contest entry, 11 potential songs were written for consideration by several songwriters appointed by the singer during a two-day songwriting camp organised by RigaLive and held in late 2020. In regards to her song, Samanta Tīna stated: "I wasn't looking for a standard Eurovision classic! I wanted to have that surprise, the craziness. I wanted the song to have something glorifying so that everyone knows it's Latvia when we come out!"

The song "The Moon Is Rising" was presented to the public on 12 March 2021 during the final episode of the special documentary series  (How to win at Eurovision? Samanta Tīna's Road to Rotterdam) that covered the background preparation processes for Samanta Tīna's Eurovision performance, song and its accompanying music video, the latter being filmed by Ritvars Bluka using a mobile phone with direction and production by Aiga Baikova and Tīna herself. The documentary consisted of five episodes, commencing on 12 February 2021 and was broadcast on LTV1 as well as online via the streaming platform Replay.lv. "The Moon Is Rising" was written by Samanta Tīna together with Aminata Savadogo and Oskars Uhaņs. Savadogo represented Latvia in the Eurovision Song Contest 2015 and had composed the Latvian song in 2016.

Promotion 
Prior to the contest, Samanta Tīna specifically promoted "The Moon Is Rising" as the Latvian Eurovision entry on 17 March 2021 by performing during the Zelta Mikrofons 2021 award show, which was held at the Art and Media Technical School in Riga.

At Eurovision 

According to Eurovision rules, all nations with the exceptions of the host country and the "Big Five" (France, Germany, Italy, Spain and the United Kingdom) are required to qualify from one of two semi-finals in order to compete for the final; the top ten countries from each semi-final progress to the final. The European Broadcasting Union (EBU) split up the competing countries into six different pots based on voting patterns from previous contests, with countries with favourable voting histories put into the same pot. The semi-final allocation draw held for the Eurovision Song Contest 2020 on 28 January 2020 was used for the 2021 contest, which Latvia was placed into the second semi-final, to be held on 20 May 2021, and was scheduled to perform in the second half of the show.

Once all the competing songs for the 2021 contest had been released, the running order for the semi-finals was decided by the shows' producers rather than through another draw, so that similar songs were not placed next to each other. Latvia was set to perform in position 15, following the entry from Finland and before the entry from Switzerland.

The two semi-finals and the final were broadcast in Latvia on LTV1 with all shows featuring commentary by Toms Grēviņš who was joined by Marie N for the final. The Latvian spokesperson, who announced the top 12-point score awarded by the Latvian jury during the final, was Aminata.

Semi-final 
Samanta Tīna took part in technical rehearsals on 11 and 14 May, followed by dress rehearsals on 19 and 20 May. This included the jury show on 19 May where the professional juries of each country watched and voted on the competing entries.

The Latvian performance featured Samanta Tīna in a long green dress with fringe and crystal embellishments that symbolised femininity to create the image of a goddess, joined on stage by three backing vocalists on the side in a spaced apart line next to Tīna wearing green tights and plastic visors. During the performance, the performers did a dance routine by crowning themselves with an imaginary crown. The stage colours were green and gold as well as purple and pink with the LED screens displaying kaleidoscopic graphics that moved outwards in a circle, followed by occasional outbursts of gold and a golden hand flower. The stage outfits were designed by Latvian designer Kašers. The three backing vocalists that joined Samanta Tīna were: Kitija Bluma, Paula Saija and Una Daniela Aizgale.

At the end of the show, Latvia was not announced among the top 10 entries in the second semi-final and therefore failed to qualify to compete in the final. It was later revealed that Latvia placed seventeenth (last) in the semi-final, receiving a total of 14 points: 10 points from the televoting and 4 points from the juries.

Voting 
Voting during the three shows involved each country awarding two sets of points from 1-8, 10 and 12: one from their professional jury and the other from televoting. Each nation's jury consisted of five music industry professionals who are citizens of the country they represent. This jury judged each entry based on: vocal capacity; the stage performance; the song's composition and originality; and the overall impression by the act. In addition, each member of a national jury may only take part in the panel once every three years, and no jury was permitted to discuss of their vote with other members or be related in any way to any of the competing acts in such a way that they cannot vote impartially and independently. The individual rankings of each jury member in an anonymised form as well as the nation's televoting results were released shortly after the grand final.

Below is a breakdown of points awarded to Latvia and awarded by Latvia in the second semi-final and grand final of the contest, and the breakdown of the jury voting and televoting conducted during the two shows:

Points awarded to Latvia

Points awarded by Latvia

Detailed voting results 
The following members comprised the Latvian jury:
  (Patrisha)
 Magnuss Eriņš
 
 
 Guna Zučika

References

External links 
 
 

2021
Countries in the Eurovision Song Contest 2021
Eurovision